Avni Qahili (Skopje, 12 September 1967) is a Macedonian-Albanian TV presenter, songwriter and musician.

Life
Qahili finished studies in Prishtina in 1991 and studies in Skopje in 1993. Got hired in Macedonian National Television in 1992, where he still works up to this date. Have been cooperating with Kosovo's magazine "Zëri", magazine in Macedonia "Bis", magazine in Albania "Paloma" and with DW (Deutsche Welle) in the "Periskop" project. He is the author of approximately 5000 song lyrics, and has been working with almost all new and famous Albanian singers.

In many various festivals his songs have gotten to the first place and also have been rewarded with the best lyric writer (author) on the same festivals. Worth highlighting is the prize for Best Lyrics in 2004 in the "Ohridski Trubaduri" International festival of Ohrid.

Has realized thousands of TV programs and shows which have been the most viewed in republican level and region, with which many times have been awarded as the "Journalist of the year" from Macedonian National Television.

He is the head of the board of "Netët e klipit shqiptar", "Miss Shqipëria" and "Miss Globe International".
Also a member of the Macedonian Team for choosing the song for Eurovision song contest. In addition, the chief of the Albanian delegation on Turk Vision festival, and many other well known festivals.

One of the most wanted presenters in Macedonia, Kosovo, Albania and diaspora where he presents various musical spectacles and also various literature and cultural promotions.

He lives and works in Skopje – his birthplace, even though during the year he travels the world more than he is home.

References

Living people
1977 births